Dauin, officially the Municipality of Dauinis a 4th class municipality in the province of Negros Oriental, Philippines. According to the 2020 census, it has a population of 30,018 people.

Geography
It is bordered on the north by Bacong and Valencia, on the south by Zamboanguita, and on the west a mountain range separates it from Santa Catalina. The municipality is a coastal town, the Bohol Sea forming its eastern border.

Barangays
Dauin is politically subdivided into 23 barangays.

Climate

Demographics

Economy

Tourism

Scuba diving is a principle industry in Dauin. Several marine reserves and dive sites are situated along the coast. Apo Island, which is included in the territory of Dauin, is a 72-hectare volcanic outcrop several kilometers off the coast that attracts large numbers of scuba and snorkel enthusiasts.

Some of the province's most popular resorts are situated along Dauin's beaches. Most are focused  on diving with regular excursions to Dauin's marine reserves and Apo Island.

Mt Talinis Geothermal Reserve is also included within the territory of Dauin. This reserve includes Mag-Aso and the Malungcay Hot Springs.

Dauin's San Nicolas church is the oldest in the province. In front of the church and along the beach are the ruins of two dome-shaped watchtowers said to have been used to warn against pirates.

Dauin hosts several popular beach resorts with both local and foreign tourists. The coast of Dauin offers scuba dive sites with both coral reef and muck dive opportunities. The municipality has established several sanctuaries, within which fishing and boating is absolutely prohibited. This includes sites such as Mainit sanctuary, Luca sanctuary, Dauin sanctuary and Masaplod sanctuary. These sites are well preserved and offer a huge variety and quantity of life forms.

Dauin also offers Muck diving, which on a point of view of biodiversity can be compared to the dives in Lembeh Strait in Indonesia. Greater blueringed octopus, Wonderpus, Mimic octopus, Poison ocellate octopus, Ambon scorpionfishes, Flamboyant cuttlefishes, bluespotted stingrays, nudibranchs, and many species of frogfish (most amazing critters in the world) are frequent sights on the sandy shores of the municipality.

Apo Island is part of the jurisdiction of the municipality of Dauin. The island is also a popular site for scuba diving. As it is completely surrounded by coral reefs, the whole island is a dive site. Popular dive sites include Coconut Point, Mamsa, Cogon, Rockpoint and Chapel. Bigeyed Jacks, turtles, bumphead parrotfish and sea snakes are inhabiting the reefs of the island. It is accessible by boat, 30 minutes from the mainland.

Another tourist attraction of Dauin is the Baslay Hot Spring.  The hot spring is located in Barangay Baslay.  The water from the hot spring contains natural sulphur which is known to have health benefits.

Education

Public High Schools

Elementary schools
 Apo Elementary School 
 Bagacay Elementary School 
 Baslay Elementary School 
 Bulak Elementary School 
 Casile Elementary School 
 Dauin Central Elementary School 
 Maayongtubig Elementary School 
 Mag-aso Elementary School 
 Magsaysay Elementary School 
 ONE International School 
 Malongcay Elementary School 
 Masaplod Elementary School 
 Panubtuban Elementary School 
 Tugawe Elementary School

References

External links

 [ Philippine Standard Geographic Code]
Philippine Census Information
Local Governance Performance Management System 

Municipalities of Negros Oriental